Cygwin is a Unix-like environment and command-line interface for Microsoft Windows. Cygwin's purpose is expressed in its motto: "Get that Linux feeling – on Windows". 

The terminal emulator Mintty is the default command-line interface provided to interact with the environment. The Cygwin installation's directory layout mimics the root file system of Unix-like systems, with directories such as /bin, /home, /etc, /usr, and /var.  

In addition to providing many Unix utilities and a Unix look and feel, Cygwin allows source code designed for Unix-like operating systems to be compiled and run on Windows with minimal modification. 

Cygwin provides native integration of Windows-based applications. Thus it is possible to launch Windows applications from the Cygwin environment, as well as to use Cygwin tools and applications within the Windows operating context. 

Cygwin consists of two parts:
 a dynamic-link library (DLL) in the form of a C standard library that acts as a compatibility layer for the POSIX API.
 an extensive collection of software tools and applications that provide a Unix-like look and feel.

Cygwin is free and open-source software, released under the GNU Lesser General Public License version 3. It was originally developed by Cygnus Solutions, which was later acquired by Red Hat (now part of IBM), to port the Linux toolchain to Win32, including the GNU Compiler Suite. Rather than rewrite the tools to use the Win32 runtime environment, Cygwin implemented a POSIX-compatible environment in the form of a dynamic-link library (DLL).

Description
The Cygwin environment is provided in two versions; the full 64-bit version and a stripped down 32-bit version that is slowly being phased out. Cygwin consists of a library that implements the POSIX system call API in terms of Windows system calls to enable running of a large number of application programs equivalent to those on Unix systems, and a GNU development toolchain (including GCC and GDB) to allow software development. Programmers have ported many Unix, GNU, BSD and Linux programs and packages to Cygwin, including the X Window System, K Desktop Environment 3, GNOME, Apache, and TeX. Cygwin permits installing inetd, syslogd, sshd, Apache, and other daemons as standard Windows services, allowing Microsoft Windows systems to emulate Unix and Linux servers.

Cygwin programs are installed by running Cygwin's "setup" program, which downloads the necessary program and feature package files from repositories on the Internet. As mentioned, there are two versions of this setup program, one for 32-bit versions of the Cygwin DLL, and corresponding applications, and one for 64-bit versions. Setup can install, update, and remove programs and their source code packages. A complete installation will take in excess of 90 GB of hard disk space, but usable configurations may require as little as 1 or 2 GB.

Efforts to reconcile concepts that differ between Unix and Windows systems include:
 A Cygwin-specific version of the Unix mount command allows mounting Windows paths as "filesystems" in the Unix file space. Initial mount-points can be configured in /etc/fstab, which has a format very similar to Unix systems, except that Windows paths appear in place of devices. Filesystems can be mounted in binary mode (by default), or in text mode, which enables automatic conversion between LF and CRLF endings (which only affects programs that open files without explicitly specifying text or binary mode).
 Cygwin 1.7 introduced comprehensive support for POSIX locales and many character encodings, whereby the UTF-8 Unicode encoding became the default. Windows file-names and other identifiers, which are encoded as UTF-16, are automatically converted to and from the selected character-encoding.
 Windows drive letters map to a special directory, so for example C: appears as /cygdrive/c. The /cygdrive prefix can be changed. Windows network paths of the form \\HOST\SHARE\FILE are mapped to //HOST/SHARE/FILE. Windows paths can also be used directly from Cygwin programs, but many programs do not support them correctly, hence this is discouraged.
 Full-featured /dev and /proc file-systems are provided. /proc/registry provides direct filesystem access to the registry.
 Cygwin supports POSIX symbolic links, representing them as plain-text files with the system attribute set. Cygwin 1.5 represented them as Windows Explorer shortcuts, but this was changed for reasons of performance and POSIX correctness. Cygwin also recognises NTFS junction points and symbolic links and treats them as POSIX symbolic links, but it does not create them as their semantics are not fully POSIX-compliant.
 The POSIX API for handling access control lists (ACLs) is supported and maps to the Windows NT ACL system.
 Special formats of /etc/passwd and /etc/group are provided that include pointers to the Windows equivalent SIDs (in the Gecos field), allowing for mapping between Unix and Windows users and groups.
 The fork system call for duplicating a process is fully implemented, but it does not map well to the Windows API. For example, the copy-on-write optimization strategy could not be used. As a result, Cygwin's fork is rather slow compared with Linux and others. (That overhead can often be avoided by replacing uses of the fork/exec technique with calls to the spawn functions declared in the Windows-specific process.h header).
 The Cygwin DLL contains a console driver that emulates a Unix-style terminal within the Windows console. Cygwin's default user interface is the bash shell running in the Cygwin console.
 The DLL also implements pseudo terminal (pty) devices. Cygwin ships with a number of terminal emulators that are based on them, including mintty, rxvt(-unicode), and xterm. These are more compliant with Unix terminal standards and user interface conventions than the Cygwin console, but are less suited for running Windows console programs.
 Various utilities are provided for converting between Windows and Unix paths and file formats, for handling line ending (CRLF/LF) issues, for displaying the DLLs that an executable is linked with, etc.
 Apart from always being linked against the Cygwin DLL, Cygwin executables are normal Windows executables. This means that Cygwin programs have full access to the Windows API and other Windows libraries, which allows gradual porting of programs from one platform to the other. However, programmers need to be careful about mixing conflicting POSIX and Windows functions.

The version of gcc that comes with Cygwin has various extensions for creating Windows DLLs, specifying whether a program is a windowing or console-mode program, adding resources, etc. Support for compiling programs that do not require the POSIX compatibility layer provided by the Cygwin DLL used to be included in the default gcc, but  is provided by cross-compilers contributed by the MinGW-w64 project.

Cygwin is used heavily for porting many popular pieces of software to the Windows platform. It is used to compile Sun Java, LibreOffice, and even web server software like Lighttpd and Hiawatha.

The Cygwin API library is licensed under the GNU Lesser General Public License version 3 (or later) with an exception to allow linking to any free and open-source software whose license conforms to the Open Source Definition (less strict than the Free Software Definition).

History
Cygwin began in 1995 as a project of Steve Chamberlain, a Cygnus engineer who observed that Windows NT and 95 used COFF as their object file format, and that GNU already included support for x86 and COFF, and the C library newlib. He thought it would be possible to retarget GCC and produce a cross compiler generating executables that could run on Windows. This proved practical and a prototype was quickly developed.

The next step was to attempt to bootstrap the compiler on a Windows system, requiring sufficient emulation of Unix to let the GNU configure shell script run. A Bourne shell-compatible command interpreter, such as bash, was needed and in turn a fork system call emulation and standard input/output. Windows includes similar functionality, so the Cygwin library just needed to provide a POSIX-compatible application programming interface (API) and properly translate calls and manage private versions of data, such as file descriptors.

Initially, Cygwin was called gnuwin32 (not to be confused with the current GnuWin32 project). The name was changed to Cygwin32 to emphasize Cygnus' role in creating it. When Microsoft registered the trademark Win32, the 32 was dropped to simply become Cygwin.

By 1996, other engineers had joined in, because it was clear that Cygwin would be a useful way to provide Cygnus' embedded tools hosted on Windows systems (the previous strategy had been to use DJGPP). It was especially attractive because it was possible to do a three-way cross-compile, for instance to use a hefty Sun Microsystems workstation to build, say, a Windows-x-MIPS cross-compiler, which was faster than using the PC at the time. In 1999, Cygnus offered Cygwin 1.0 as a commercial product of interest in its own right although subsequent versions have not been released, instead relying on continued open source releases.

Geoffrey Noer was the project lead from 1996 to 1999. Christopher Faylor was the project lead from 1999 to mid-2014. Corinna Vinschen became co-lead since 2004 when Faylor left Red Hat and has been lead since mid-2014, when Faylor withdrew from active participation in the project.

From June 23, 2016 the Cygwin library version 2.5.2 was licensed under the GNU Lesser General Public License (LGPL) version 3, so is now possible to link against closed source applications. Before this was available there were two possibilities: to release the source code of the application or buy a Cygwin license to release a closed source application.

Features
Cygwin's base package selection is fairly small (about 100 MB), containing little more than the bash (interactive user) and dash (installation) shells and the core file and text manipulation utilities expected of a Unix command line. Additional packages are available as optional installs from within the Cygwin Setup program and package manager ("setup-x86_64.exe" – 64bit). These include (from over 12000 others):
 Shells (i.e. command line interpreters): bash, dash, fish, pdksh, tcsh, zsh, mksh
 File and system utilities: coreutils, findutils, util-linux
 Text utilities: grep, sed, diff, patch, awk
 Terminals: mintty, rxvt, screen
 Editors: ed, emacs, joe, mined, nano, vim
 Remote login: ssh, rsh, telnet
 Remote file transfer/synchronization: ftp, scp, rsync, unison, rtorrent
 Compression/archiving: tar, gzip, bzip2, lzma, zip
 Text processing: TeX, groff, Ghostscript
 Programming languages: C, C++, Objective-C, Fortran, Gambas, Perl, Python, Ruby, Tcl, Ada, CLISP, Scheme, OCaml, Prolog
 Development tools: make, autotools, flex, bison, doxygen
 Version control systems: cvs, subversion, git, mercurial
 Servers: Apache, BIND, PostgreSQL, Pure-FTPd, OpenSSH, telnetd, exim, UW IMAP
 Clients: Mutt (email), Lynx (web), Irssi (IRC), tin (newsgroups)

The Cygwin/X project contributes an implementation of the X Window System that allows graphical Unix programs to display their user interfaces on the Windows desktop. This can be used with both local and remote programs. Cygwin/X supports over 500 packages including major X window managers, desktop environments, and applications, for example:
 Terminals: rxvt-unicode, xterm
 Editors: emacs-X11, gvim
 Text processors/viewers: LyX, xpdf, xdvi
 Web browsers: epiphany, konqueror, links, lynx, midori, qupzilla, w3m

In addition to the low-level Xlib/XCB libraries for developing X applications, Cygwin ships with various higher-level and cross-platform GUI frameworks, including GTK+ and Qt.

The Cygwin Ports project provided many additional packages that were not available in the Cygwin distribution itself. Examples included GNOME and K Desktop Environment 3 as well as the MySQL database and the PHP scripting language. Most ports have been adopted by volunteer maintainers as Cygwin packages, and Cygwin Ports are no longer maintained.

See also

References

External links

 

Compatibility layers
Programming tools
Free compilers and interpreters
Free emulation software
Free software programmed in C
Free software programmed in C++
Red Hat software
System administration
Unix emulators
Windows-only free software